Oleh Morhun (born 10 January 1965) is a former Soviet and Ukrainian footballer and Ukrainian football manager.

External links
 
 

1965 births
Living people
Footballers from Zaporizhzhia
Soviet footballers
Ukrainian footballers
Association football goalkeepers
SC Tavriya Simferopol players
FC FShM Torpedo Moscow players
PFC CSKA Moscow players
FC CSKA-2 Moscow players
SC Odesa players
FC Shakhtar Donetsk players
FC Vorskla Poltava players
FC Etar Veliko Tarnovo players
PFC Levski Sofia players
FC Vorskla-2 Poltava players
Ukrainian Premier League players
FC Vorskla-2 Poltava managers
FC Vorskla Poltava managers
Expatriate footballers in Bulgaria
Ukrainian expatriate footballers
Ukrainian football managers